Chaplain Ebenezer Baldwin (July 3, 1745 – October 1, 1776) was a religious leader in Connecticut in the years before the American Revolution. 

He was the eldest son of Captain Ebenezer Baldwin of Norwich, Connecticut; and grandson of Thomas and Abigail (Lay) Baldwin, of that part of Norwich which is now Bozrah. His mother was Bethiah, sister of the Rev. Nehemiah Barker (Yale 1742), under whom he studied to enter Yale College.

History
The records of the first Church of Christ in Danbury were "begun September 19, 1770, kept by Ebenezer. Baldwin Pastor of said church." "Sept. 19, Ebenezer Baldwin from Norwich was ordained Pastor of the First Church in Danbury, by the Consociation of the Eastern District of Fairfield County."

The pastorate of Mr. Baldwin covered those exciting years in the national history that preceded and marked the commencement of the American Revolution. At that day no class of citizens was more conspicuous for patriotism than the Congregational clergy of New England, and among them Mr. Baldwin was noted for his zeal and signal ability. Almost all the writing for the public prints at that time was done by the clergy. In 1774 Mr. Baldwin prepared and published a spirited address to the people of the western part of the colony to arouse them to a sense of the danger in which their liberties were involved. In November, 1775, on the day set apart for Thanksgiving in the Colony of Connecticut, at a period which he regarded as the most calamitous the British colonies ever beheld, he preached a sermon designed to wake up the spirits of the people in the important struggle in which they were engaged. So excellent, encouraging, and appropriate was this sermon, that it was called for and printed at the expense of a leading member of the Episcopal Church. A copy is preserved in the archives of the New York Historical Society. Mr. Baldwin, with other ministers of the Association, arranged a series of circular fasts in the churches of Fairfield County in the spring of 1776 on "account of the threatening aspect of public affairs."

Mr. Baldwin's brother Simeon and James Kent, afterward Chancellor Kent of New York, and author of Kent's Commentaries, were members of a class of young men who studied under the direction of Mr. Baldwin while pastor of this church. Chancellor Kent, in a Phi Beta Kappa oration given at Yale in 1831, paid a tribute to the memory of Baldwin. Speaking of the tutors in that college, he said:

"Suffer me for a moment to bring to recollection from among this class of men the Rev. Ebenezer Baldwin, of Danbury, for it is to that great and excellent man that the individual who has now the honor to address you stands indebted for the best part of his early classical education. Mr. Baldwin was tutor in this college for the period of four years, and he settled as a minister in the First Congregational Church of Danbury in the year 1770. He was a scholar and a gentleman of the fairest and brightest hopes. He was accustomed to read daily a portion of the Hebrew Scriptures, and he was extensively acquainted with Greek and Roman literature. His style of preaching was simple, earnest, and forcible, with the most commanding and graceful dignity of manner. His zeal for learning was ardent, and his acquisitions and reputation rapidly increasing, when he was doomed to fall prematurely in the flower of his age, and while engaged in his country's service. Though his career was painfully short, he had lived long enough to attract general notice and the highest respect by his piety, his learning, his judgment, and his patriotism. He took an enlightened and active interest in the rise and early progress of the American Revolution. In the gloomy campaign of 1776 he was incessant in his efforts to cheer and animate his townsmen to join the militia which were called out for the defense of New York. To give weight to his eloquent exhortations, he added that of heroic example. He went voluntarily as a chaplain to one of the militia regiments, composed mostly of his own parishioners. His office was pacific, but he nevertheless arrayed himself in military armor.

"I was present when he firmly but affectionately bade adieu to his devoted parishioners and affectionate pupils. This was about August 1st, 1776, and what a moment in the annals of this country! There never was a period more awful and portentous. it was the very crisis of our destiny. The defense of New York had become desperate. An enemy's army of thirty thousand men, well disciplined and well equipped, was in its vicinity ready to overwhelm it. General George Washington had, to oppose them, less than eighteen thousand men, and part of them extremely sickly. Nothing could have afforded better proof of patriotic zeal than Mr. Baldwin's voluntary enlistment at this critical juncture. The militia, much reduced by sickness, after two months' service were discharged. Mr. Baldwin fell a victim to the sickness that prevailed in the army, having only strength sufficient to reach home, where he died October 1st, ' honored by the deepest sympathies of his own people, and with the public veneration and sorrow.' "

The inscription upon his tombstone was prepared by President Stiles, of Yale College, and is as follows:

"In memory of Rev. Ebenezer Baldwin, A.M., late pastor of the First Church in Danbury, who was born at Norwich, July 13th, 1745; received his education at Yale College, where he was graduated in 1763, and officiated several years with singular reputation as a tutor in that university; ordained a minister of the Gospel, September 19th, 1770, and died October 1st, 1776. He was eminent for literature and piety, an enlightened divine, an instructive preacher. Distinguished for dignity of manners and public usefulness; a true and faithful patriot, an ornament to the church, to the ministry and to his country. In grateful remembrance of this worthy pastor and generous benefactor, the First Society of Danbury have erected this monument."

He was the brother of US Representative and Judge Simeon Baldwin, the uncle of Roger Sherman Baldwin and great-uncle of Simeon Eben Baldwin.

References
 Biographical Sketches of the Graduates of Yale College, Vol. 3, 1903
 History of Danbury, Conn. 1684 - 1896, 1896

External links 
Baldwin Family Papers (MS 55). Manuscripts and Archives, Yale University Library.

1745 births
1776 deaths
People of Connecticut in the American Revolution
People of colonial Connecticut
18th-century American people